Ramesh Khanna (also spelt as Ramesh Kanna) is an Indian actor and film director who has worked in Tamil cinema. He has acted in a number of supporting and comedian roles.

Early life
Khanna was born on 20 Nov 1952 in Chennai and third child to the family. He acted in R. S. Manohar's drama troupe from the age of 5 as child artist of more than 1000 dramas up to his age of 10 and was appreciated by Sarvepalli Radhakrishnan, President of India at that time.

Cinema career
He became assistant to directors Karaikudi Narayanan, Pandiarajan (Aan Paavam), Kodi Ramakrishna, Vikraman (Poove Unakkaga, Suryavamsam, Unnai Ninaithu and Priyamana Thozhi) and K.S.Ravikumar. Ravikumar was meant to remake the Telugu film Maavichiguru (1996) starring Jagapati Babu and Aamani into Tamil for Sridevi Movie Makers, but his busy schedule meant that he recommended Ramesh Khanna to the producers. The remake was initially titled as Maa Vilakku and was supposed to star Jayaram and Meena, but went through cast changes. The film was revived under new title Thodarum with new cast involving Ajith Kumar, Heera and Devayani. He later started working on a film titled Genius in 2000, but the project eventually was shelved.

Only after, director Vikraman introduced him as comedian in Unnidathil Ennai Koduthen (1998), he came to limelight with his amazing comic timing.

Khanna has acted in notable roles in films such as Padayappa (1999), Friends (2001), Unnai Ninaithu (2002) and Villain (2002). He has also appeared in supporting roles in films such as Thulluvadho Ilamai (2002).

Ramesh has written dialogues for Muni (2007) and Nam Naadu (2007) and written story of the film Aadhavan (2009).

Ramesh Khanna is seen in a substantial role in the Ajith starrer Veeram (2014).

TV Programs

Filmography
Actor

Mundhanai Mudichu (1983)
Aan Paavam (1985)
Yetikku Potti (1987) as Postman
Abhirami (1992)
Gokulam (1993)
Naan Pesa Ninaipathellam (1993)
Athma (1993)
Captain (1994)
Muthu (1995)
Muthukulikka Vaariyala (1995)
Avvai Shanmughi (co-director) (1996)
Dharma Chakkaram (1997)
Suryavamsam (1997) as Kathiresan
Kondattam (1998)
Kaadhal Mannan (1998)
Thulli Thirintha Kaalam (1998)
Unnidathil Ennai Koduthen (1998) as Selvam's friend
Guru Paarvai (1998) as Lingam
Amarkalam (1999) as Singampuli
Nee Varuvai Ena (1999)
Rojavanam (1999)
Padayappa (1999) as Padayappa's friend 
Chinna Raja (1999)
Ullathai Killathe (1999)
Jodi (1999)
Thenali (2000) as Panchabootham's assistant
Koodi Vazhnthal Kodi Nanmai (2000) as Ramesh
Vetri Kodi Kattu (2000) as Sekar's friend
Appu (2000)
Unnai Kodu Ennai Tharuven (2000)
Annai (2000)
Vaanathaippola (2000) as Hotel Servant 
Vinnukum Mannukum (2001)
Star (2001)
Kunguma Pottu Gounder (2001)
Kalakalappu (2001) as Sreenivasan
Krishna Krishna (2001) as Sivaramakrishnan
Asathal (2001) as Victor
Rishi (2001) as Cheenu
Nageswari (2001)
Friends (2001) as Krishnamoorthy
Villain (2002) as Shiva's friend
Saptham (2002) as Jagir
Unnai Ninaithu (2002) as Krishnamoorthy
Thulluvadho Ilamai (2002) as Mani
Panchathantiram (2002) as Sardarji, Police
Pammal K. Sambandam (2002) as Sammandham's friend
Naina (2002) as Pichu
Kadhal Virus (2002) as himself
Junior Senior (2002)
I Love You Da (2002) as Madhan
Gemini (2002) as Professor
Dhaya (2002)
Jaya (2002)
Unnai Paartha Naal Mudhal (2003)
Saamy (2003) as Inspector Paramasivam
Paarai (2003) as Barber
Military (2003) as Ganesan
Kadhaludan (2003) as Ramesh
Jayam (2003)
Priyamaana Thozhi (2003) as 'Kaka' Ramesh
Indru Mudhal (2003)
Anjaneya (2003)
Aasai Aasaiyai (2003)
Thendral (2004) as Sundarakanth
Sau Jhooth Ek Sach (2004) as Saloon Customer
Maha Nadigan (2004)
Gajendra (2004)
Attahasam (2004) as Surula
Arivumani (2004)
Cheppave Chirugali (2004; Telugu)
Priyasakhi (2005)
Girivalam (2005)
Vattaram (2006)
Kodambakkam (2006)
Keerthi Chakra (2006; Malayalam)
Kedi (2006)
Idhaya Thirudan (2006)
Varalaru (2006) as Ramesh
Manasu Palike Mouna Raagam (2006; Telugu)
Thiru Ranga (2007) as Beeda
Nam Naadu (2007)
Vambu Sandai (2008)
Ini Varum Kaalam (2008)
Dasavathaaram (2008) as Doctor
Sila Nerangalil (2008) as Photographer
Thodakkam (2008)
Yen Indha Mounam (2009)
Mariyadhai (2009)
Aadhavan (2009) as Ilayaman
Yathumaagi (2010)
Irumbukkottai Murattu Singam (2010) as Jada
Gowravargal (2010)
Uyarthiru 420 (2011)
Venghai (2011) as Thangavelu
Policegiri (2013) as Wine Shop Owner
Ninaithathu Yaaro (2014)
Murugatrupadai (2014) as Manda Kashayam
Kochadaiiyaan (2014) as Nagesh
Veeram (2014) as Subbu collector
Uchathula Shiva (2016) as Sundar
Vaigai Express (2017) as Ramesh
Bhaskar Oru Rascal (2018) as Devadas
Saamy 2 (2018) as Punctuality Paramasivam
Pei Mama (2021)
Obama Ungalukkaaga (2021)
D Block (2022)

As director
 Thodarum (1999) (Starring Ajith Kumar)
 Top Tucker (1988) (TV serial) - Sun TV (Starring Vivek)

As writer
 Aarathi Edungadi (1990) (dialogues)
 Rasathi Varum Naal (1991) (dialogues)
 Vaasalile Oru Vennila (1991) (dialogues)
 Mudhal Paadal (1993) (dialogues)
 Periya Kudumbam (1995) (dialogue)
 Aadhavan (2009) (story)
 Muni (2007) (dialogues)
 Nam Naadu (2007) (dialogues)
 Bhaskar Oru Rascal (2018) (dialogues)

As Dubbing artist
 Vaikunthapuram (2020) (Tamil dubbed) for Rajendra Prasad

References

External links 
 

Indian male comedians
Living people
Tamil film directors
Indian comedians
Male actors in Tamil cinema
Indian male film actors
20th-century Indian male actors
21st-century Indian male actors
Indian screenwriters
1954 births